Burnside is a British television police procedural drama, broadcast on ITV in 2000. The series, a spin-off from ITV's long-running police drama The Bill, focused on DCI Frank Burnside, formerly a detective at Sun Hill and now working for the National Crime Squad. Burnside ran for one series of six episodes, structured as three two-part stories.

Background
The lead character of the series was Detective Chief Inspector Frank Burnside, who had appeared in The Bill almost from its inception as a tough, no-nonsense antagonist to the station staff. Burnside disappeared in mysterious circumstances in 1993 and returned briefly five years later, when it was revealed that he had been working undercover. The main secondary characters were Detective Sergeant Dave Summers and Detective Constable Sam Phillips. Burnside's NCS team also included the minor characters of DC Pete Moss, played by John White, and DC Chris Gibson, played by Paul Gilmore. In addition, several recurring characters appeared throughout the series: Paul Nicholas played Ronnie "The Razor" Buchan, a former London gangster and Burnside's nemesis. Tony Selby played Jim Summers, the father of Dave Summers and Burnside's former boss. Shane Richie played Burnside's regular informant, Tony Shotton.

Legacy 
Reflecting on the series some years later, the actor who played Burnside, Christopher Ellison, was critical of the quality of its writing, suggesting it compared unfavourably with The Bill. In particular, he pointed to the absence of the character's trademark one-liner jokes, making the series "all so black and serious".

Interviewed on The Bill Podcast in 2019, Ellison said:

"I always thought a huge mistake they made when we did the spin-off series called Burnside was that they changed the format completely, and the one thing I always felt it lost was its humour. I know Burnside was a horrible character in a lot of ways but he was quite funny; he said funny things. And that was one of the most enjoyable things about it."

Cast

Episodes

Merchandise

DVDs

Books

See also
 The Bill
 Murder Investigation Team

References

External links
Burnside official website

2000s British crime drama television series
2000s British television miniseries
2000 British television series debuts
2000 British television series endings
British television spin-offs
English-language television shows
ITV television dramas
Television shows set in London
Television series by Fremantle (company)
Television shows produced by Thames Television
The Bill